Willis Jackson may refer to:

Willis Jackson, Baron Jackson of Burnley (1904–1970), British technologist and electrical engineer
Willis Jackson (saxophonist) (1932–1987), American jazz tenor saxophonist
Willis Jackson, fictional character on the U. S. sitcom Diff'rent Strokes